Admesturius bitaeniatus is a species of jumping spider found in Chile. The species was first described in 1901 by Eugène Simon.

References

bitaeniatus
Fauna of Chile
Spiders of South America
Spiders described in 1901
Endemic fauna of Chile